McLean Buttress is a buttress-like mountain or promontory at the north side of Webb Lake and Barwick Valley in Victoria Land, Antarctica. It rises abruptly from the valley and marks the southern limit of the cliffs known as The Fortress.

See also
Johns Cirque, on the east side of McLean Buttress

References

External links

Mountains of Victoria Land
McMurdo Dry Valleys